Evdokia Loukagkou (born 26 September 1995) is a Greek rhythmic gymnast. She participated in the London 2012 Olympic Games.

Career 
Loukagkou was born and raised in Thessaloniki. At the age of five, she began to train at the AO DIbuy Club in Thessaloniki, in 2009 she became a member of the Greek national rhythmic gymnastics' team.

Evdokia participated in the 2012 Olympics in London, the United Kingdom with the Greek group. Competing together with: Eleni Doika, Alexia Kyriazi, Stavroula Samara, Vasileia Zachou and Marianthi Zafeiriou, they scored 51.875 points in the qualifying round and ending in 9th place.

References 

1995 births
Living people
Greek rhythmic gymnasts
Gymnasts at the 2012 Summer Olympics
Olympic gymnasts of Greece
Gymnasts from Thessaloniki
21st-century Greek women